Dicktown may refer to:

 Dicktown, New York, a ghost town
 Dicktown (TV series), an American adult animated sitcom